Pearn, Pollinger & Higham (Ltd) was an English firm of literary agents based in London during the early twentieth century. They were agents for Graham Greene, Paul Scott and James Herriot, among others.

History
The three founders, Nancy Pearn, Laurence Pollinger and David Higham, all worked at the Curtis Brown agency after the First World War. When Curtis Brown's founder Albert brought in his son to run the company, Pearn, Pollinger & Higham was created, with help from a loan from Harold Macmillan, among others. The company began trading in 1935, and continued as such until 1956, when it was renamed David Higham Associates following the death of Nancy Pearn and the departure of Laurence Pollinger.

References

British literary agencies
Defunct companies based in London